Archduchess Eleonora of Austria (28 November 1886 – 26 May 1974) was a daughter of  Archduke Charles Stephen of Austria and a first cousin of King Alphonso XIII of Spain. She was member of the Teschen branch of the House of Habsburg-Lorraine and an Archduchess of Austria and Princess of Bohemia, Hungary, and Tuscany by birth.  She renounced to her titles upon her morganatic marriage to Alfons Kloss, the captain of her father's yacht. During World War II her sons served in the German army.

Background and early life

Archduchess Eleonora was the eldest daughter of Archduke Charles Stephen of Austria and his wife, Archduchess Maria Theresa of Austria, Princess of Tuscany. Both of her parents were closely related to Emperor Franz Joseph. Her father, a grandson of archduke Karl of Austria who had led the Austrian army against Napoleon Bonaparte, was a brother of Queen Maria Christina of Spain. Eleonora’s mother, Archduchess Maria Theresa of Austria, Princess of Tuscany, was a granddaughter of Leopold II, the last reigning Grand Duke of Tuscany. On her maternal side, she was a granddaughter of King Ferdinand II of the Two Sicilies.

Archduchess Eleonora was born in Pula, Austria-Hungary, now Croatia, where her father was stationed as a naval officer. She was educated by private tutors, with an educational emphasis on languages. She learned German, Italian, English, French and from 1895 Polish. Her father followed a career in the Austrian Navy and Eleanore spent her formative years primarily in Istria in the then Austrian port of Pula in the Adriatic. Her father was very wealthy and the family had a summer villa in the island of Losinj in the Adriatic, a palace in Vienna and maintain a luxurious yacht for summer cruises. In 1895 her father inherited from Archduke Albert vast properties in  Galicia. From 1907 the family main residence was in Zywiec castle in western Galicia today Poland, but still they spent the winters in Istria.

Marriage
At age fifteen, Archduchess Eleanore fell in love with Alfons von Kloss, a sailor who worked as the captain of her father's yacht. Their relationship grew during many family's Mediterranean cruises. Archduke Charles Stephen had wished to marry his eldest daughter to a Polish aristocrat, but he was touched by the couple's true love and persistence. He contacted the emperor, asking him to authorize the union. Emperor Franz Joseph was inflexible on family matters, but he was a good friend of Archduke Charles Stephen of Austria and gave his permission.

The wedding, a modest ceremony, took place on 9 January 1913 at Saybusch, Poland, two days before the wedding of her sister Archduchess Mechthildis of Austria. Archduchess Eleanore renounced to her titles upon her marriage becoming simply Mrs von Kloss. The couple settled in Istria. Alfons von Kloss worked as Corvette Captain in the Imperial navy, and served with distinction during World War I. Eleanore and her husband stayed in Austria after the fall of the monarchy and lived in Baden near Vienna, in a large villa Eleanore had inherited from her childless uncle Archduke Rainer of Austria. One of her sons, Alfons, was military Attache at the Austrian Embassy in Washington, DC. Her husband died in 1953, Eleanora survived him by 21 years and died in 1974 at the age of 87. Most of her many descendants still live in Austria.

Children
Archduchess Eleonora and Alfons von Kloss (1880–1953) had eight children:
 Albrecht von Kloss (1913–1963); married Erika Kaiser. They had one son and two daughters.  
 Karl von Kloss (1915–1939)
 Rainer von Kloss (1916–1991); married Cornelia Schoute and had one son and one daughter.
 Ernest von Kloss (1919–2017); married Ritxa Harting and had three sons and one daughter.
 Alfons von Kloss (1920–2002); married Theresia von Coreth zu Coredo and had three sons.
 Frederich von Kloss (1922–1943)
 Maria Theresia von Kloss (1925–?); married Walter Kaiser and had four sons and one daughter.
 Stephan von Kloss (1933–?); married Ingrid Morocutti and had three sons and three daughters.

Ancestry

References

 McIntosh David, The Unknown Habsburgs, Rovall Royal Books, 2000. 
 Snyder, Timothy, The Red Prince: The Secret Lives of A Habsburg Archduke. Basic Books, 2008. 

1886 births
1974 deaths
House of Habsburg-Lorraine
Austrian princesses
Austro-Hungarian people of World War I
People from Pula